Bulut is a Turkish given name for men and a surname (meaning "cloud") and may refer to:

Given name
 Bulut Basmaz, Turkish football player

Surname
 Dušan Domović Bulut, Serbian basketball player
 Erol Bulut, Turkish-German football player
 Gamze Bulut (born 1992), Turkish athlete
 Kerem Bulut, Turkish-Australian football player
 Nazan Bulut (born 1973), Turkish women's football player and teacher
 Samet Bulut (born 1996), Dutch football player
 Umut Bulut, Turkish football player

Turkish-language surnames
Turkish masculine given names